Simund de Freine (Simon de Fresne) (fl. 1200) was an Anglo-Norman cleric and poet. He was a canon of Hereford Cathedral and a friend of Giraldus Cambrensis.

Works
Simund's major works were two long poems in Norman French, in heptasyllabic verse, each identified by acrostics:

De la Fortune, an adaptation of the De Consolatio Philosophiæ by Boethius, 1700 lines. 
La vie de Saint Georges.

He addressed two epigrams to Giraldus Cambrensis, defending him against detractors, such as Adam of Dore. Simund's patron is thought to be William de Vere.

Notes

Further reading
John E. Matzke (1909), Les oeuvres de Simund de Freine

External links
Attribution

12th-century English Roman Catholic priests
English poets
Anglo-Normans